The 2018–19 Club Universidad Nacional season is the 64th season in the football club's history and the 57th consecutive season in the top flight of Mexican football.

Coaching staff

Players

Squad information

Players and squad numbers last updated on 3 December 2018.Note: Flags indicate national team as has been defined under FIFA eligibility rules. Players may hold more than one non-FIFA nationality.

Competitions

Overview

Torneo Apertura

League table

Results summary

Result round by round

Matches

Liguilla

Quarter-finals

Semi-finals

Apertura Copa MX

Group stage

Round of 16

Quarterfinals

Torneo Clausura

League table

Results summary

Result round by round

Matches

Statistics

Squad statistics

Goals

Hat-tricks

Clean sheets

Own goals

Disciplinary record

References

External links

Mexican football clubs 2018–19 season
2018–19 in Mexican football
Club Universidad Nacional seasons